is a Japanese announcer, radio personality, entertainer, and actress who is represented by the talent agency, Cent Force.

Biography
Sugisaki was born in Ōita, Ōita Prefecture. After graduating from Ōita Prefectural Ōita Tsurusaki High School and Yamaguchi University, she joined as an announcer for Shin-etsu Broadcasting (SBC) on 2001. Sugisaki served for two and a half years until September 2003.

After leaving SBC, she passed the audition for Cent Force. Sugisaki later became the main caster in Fuji Television program Mezanew for eight years until September 30, 2011. She also gained popularity when hosting the GyaO internet program, Mika Sugisaki no Oyasumi Toshokan, and as an MC for NHK's radio programs.

Sugisaki has an ordinary vehicle driver's license and an educational personnel license (English in elementary and junior high school). She introduced in television and books such as Sōchō no Kao and Yaeba no Mezamashi Tenshi.

On the summer of 2008, Sugisaki became the vegetable sommelier of the Junior Vegetable & Fruit Meister.

In January 2015, she married the director of the Fuji TV information program, Mr. Sunday. In May 2016, she gave birth to a healthy baby boy.

Filmography

TV series

Radio series

Other

SBC era
Sugisaki was mainly in charge in television and radio news, weather forecast, reporter, etc.

TV series

Radio series

Advertisements

Music

Anime

Stage shows

Books

Photo albums

References

External links
Official profile 
 

Japanese announcers
Japanese radio personalities
Japanese entertainers
Japanese actresses
1978 births
Living people
Actors from Ōita Prefecture
People from Ōita (city)
People from Ōita Prefecture